Candle Lake is a resort village in the Canadian province of Saskatchewan within Census Division No. 15. It is on the shores of Candle Lake in the Rural Municipality of Paddockwood No. 520.

History 
Candle Lake incorporated as a resort village on August 1, 1977.

Demographics 

Government 
The Resort Village of Candle Lake is governed by an elected municipal council and an appointed administrator that meets on the second Friday of every month. The mayor is Terry Kostyna and its administrator is Brent Lutz.

See also 
List of communities in Saskatchewan
List of municipalities in Saskatchewan
List of resort villages in Saskatchewan
List of villages in Saskatchewan
List of summer villages in Alberta

References

External links
Candle Lake official website

Resort villages in Saskatchewan
Paddockwood No. 520, Saskatchewan
Division No. 15, Saskatchewan